Giffard is an Anglo-Norman surname, carried by a number of families of the Peerage of the United Kingdom and the landed gentry. They included the Earls of Halsbury and the Giffards of Chillington Hall, Staffordshire. Notable people with the surname include:

People with the surname
 Anna Marcella Giffard (1707–1777), Irish stage actress
 Bonaventure Giffard (1642–1734), Roman Catholic bishop, Vicar Apostolic of the Midland District of England 1687–1703
 Daniel Giffard (born 1984), English speedway rider
 Sir George Giffard (1886–1964), British Army general
 George Augustus Giffard (1849–1925), Royal Navy officer
 Godfrey Giffard (c.1235–1302), English politician and bishop
 Graham Giffard (born 1959), Australian politician
 Hardinge Giffard, 1st Earl of Halsbury (1823–1921), English barrister and politician
 Henri Giffard, (1825–1882), French engineer and inventor 
 Henry Giffard (1694–1772), English actor and theatre manager
 Henry Wells Giffard (1811–1854), Royal Navy officer, Captain of 
 Hugh de Giffard (died 1267), Norman-Scottish feudal baron
 John Giffard (disambiguation), several people
 Osbern Giffard (1020–1085), one of William the Conqueror's knights
 Nicolas Giffard (born 1950), French chess master
 Pierre Giffard (1853–1922), French journalist
 Robert Giffard de Moncel (1587–1668), French surgeon, colonist and businessman
 Sir Sydney Giffard (born 1926), British diplomat and author
 Sir Thomas Giffard (c.1491–1560), English courtier, landowner and MP
 Walter Giffard, Lord of Longueville (died 1084), Norman baron and companion of William the Conqueror
 Walter Giffard (c.1225–1279), Chancellor of England and Archbishop of York
 Walter Giffard, 1st Earl of Buckingham (died 1102), Anglo-Norman magnate and Justiciar of England
 Walter Giffard, 2nd Earl of Buckingham (died 1164), English peer
 Walter Giffard (Oxford), English medieval theologist and university administrator
 William Giffard (died 1129), Lord Chancellor of England

See also
 Giffard Cove on the west coast of Graham Land, Antarctica
 Sir Giffard Le Quesne Martel (1889–1958), British Army general
 Giffard dirigible built by Henri Giffard
 Gifford (disambiguation)
 Gyffard partbooks